The Wonderland murders, also known as the Four on the Floor Murders or the Laurel Canyon Murders, are four unsolved murders that occurred in
Los Angeles, California, United States, on July 1, 1981. It is assumed that five people were targeted to be killed in the known drug house of the Wonderland Gang, three of whomRon Launius, William "Billy" Deverell, and Joy Millerwere present. Launius, Deverell, and Miller, along with the girlfriend of an accomplice, Barbara Richardson, died from extensive blunt-force trauma injuries. Only Launius' wife Susan survived the attack, allegedly masterminded by organized crime figure and nightclub owner Eddie Nash. Nash, his henchman Gregory Diles, and porn star John Holmes were at various times arrested, tried, and acquitted for their involvement in the murders.

Nash robbery
The Wonderland Gang was centered on the occupants of a rented townhouse at 8763 Wonderland Avenue, in the Laurel Canyon section of Los Angeles, California: leader Ronald Lee "Ron" Launius; second-in-command William Raymond "Billy" DeVerell; DeVerell's girlfriend Joy Audrey Gold Miller, who was also the lease holder for the townhouse; Tracy Raymond McCourt; and David Clay Lind. All five were involved in drug use and drug dealing.

On June 29, 1981, Launius, DeVerell, Lind, and McCourt committed a brutal home invasion and armed robbery at the home of Eddie Nash, a nightclub owner and organized crime figure. The incident resulted in Nash's bodyguard, Gregory Dewitt Diles, being shot and injured. Nash suspected that porn star John Holmes had been involved, as he had been at Nash's house three times on the morning of the attack (at which times Holmes left the sliding door open). Nash sent Diles to retrieve Holmes for questioning; Diles supposedly spotted Holmes walking around Hollywood wearing one of Nash's rings and brought him back. Scott Thorson, a former boyfriend of Liberace who was in Nash's house to buy drugs, claimed he witnessed Holmes being tied to a chair, and repeatedly punched and his family threatened, until he revealed the assailants' identities.

Wonderland Gang murders
Around 3:00a.m. on July1, 1981, two days after the robbery, an unknown number of unidentified men entered the Wonderland Avenue townhouse and bludgeoned to death Launius, DeVerell, Miller, and Barbara Richardson (Lind's girlfriend who had been visiting). The weapons used by the killers were believed to be a combination of hammers and metal pipes.

Richardson's bloodied body was found on the living room floor, beside the couch where she had been sleeping that night. Miller was found on her bed, with DeVerell at the foot of the bed in an upright position leaning against the TV stand; a hammer was found on the bed. Launius was found beaten to death on his bed with his gravely injured wife, Susan, beside him on the floor. Both bedrooms had been thoroughly searched and ransacked. Despite suffering severe brain damage in the attack, Susan ultimately survived and recovered, although she was left with permanent amnesia regarding the night of her attack, had to have part of her skull surgically removed, and lost part of one finger.

Neither Lind nor McCourt was present during the attack.  Lind was consuming drugs with a prostitute in a motel and McCourt was at his own home. Lind died of a heroin overdose in 1995, and McCourt died in 2006.

Although neighbors would later report having heard loud screams around 3:00a.m., no phone calls were placed to the police until 4:00p.m. on July1, over twelve hours later, when furniture movers working at the house next door to the crime scene heard Susan moaning and went to investigate. The house was notorious for round-the-clock mayhem and debauchery, and when questioned, neighbors said the Wonderland Gang's drug-fueled parties often included loud, violent screaming and disruptive noise, so when they heard the murders occurring, they simply believed another party was taking place.

Police action and trials
Los Angeles Police Department (LAPD) detectives Tom Lange and Robert Souza led the murder investigation, and searched Nash's home a few days after the crime. There they found more than $1 million worth of cocaine, as well as some items stolen from the Wonderland Avenue townhouse.

An initial theory of the murders centered on Holmes. After his left palm print was found at the crime scene on the Launius' headboard, he was arrested and charged with four counts of murder in March 1982. The prosecutor, Los Angeles Deputy District Attorney Ron Coen, attempted to prove Holmes was a willing participant who betrayed the gang after not getting a full share of the loot from the Nash robbery. However, Holmes' court-appointed defense lawyers, Earl Hanson and Mitchell Egers, successfully presented Holmes as one of the victims, who had been forced by the real killers to give them entry to the house before the murders took place.

After a publicized three-week trial, Holmes was acquitted of all criminal charges on June 26, 1982. For refusing to testify or cooperate with authorities, he spent 110 days in jail for contempt of court. Shortly after the murders, in her first newspaper interview in July 1981, Holmes' first wife, Sharon Gebenini Holmes, stated he had told her he had known the people in the Wonderland Avenue townhouse, and had been there shortly before the murders occurred. She did not divulge any additional information to police. In April 1988, one month after Holmes' death, Gebenini stated in an interview with the Los Angeles Times that on the morning of the murders, Holmes had arrived at her house with blood splattered on his clothes and recounted how he led three thugs to the tightly secured drug house on Wonderland Avenue, escorted them in, and stood by as they bludgeoned the five people inside. She said Holmes never told her the names of the three other assailants.

Holmes died on March 13, 1988, as a result of AIDS complications. One month before he died, two LAPD detectives visited Holmes at the Veterans Administration hospital where he was convalescing to question him about the murders. Nothing came out of the visit because Holmes was barely awake, and his responses to their questions were incoherent.

In 1990, Nash was charged in California state court with having planned the murders, and Diles was charged as a participant. Thorson testified against them, but the trial ended with a hung jury vote of 11–1 for conviction. A second trial, in 1991, ended in acquittal for both Nash and Diles. Diles died from liver failure in 1997.

In 2000, after a four-year joint investigation involving local and federal authorities, Nash was arrested and indicted on federal charges under the Racketeer Influenced and Corrupt Organizations Act (RICO) for running a drug trafficking and money laundering operation, conspiring to carry out the Wonderland murders, and bribing the sole holdout juror of his first trial. Nash, already in his seventies and suffering from emphysema and other ailments, agreed to a plea bargain in September 2001. He admitted to having bribed the lone holdout in his first trial with $50,000, and pleaded guilty to the RICO charges and to money laundering. He also admitted to having ordered his associates to retrieve stolen property from the Wonderland Avenue townhouse, which might have resulted in violence including murder, yet he denied having planned the murders. In the end, Nash received a -year prison sentence and a $250,000 fine.

In popular culture

Films
 Boogie Nights (1997), a feature film loosely based on the life of John Holmes, includes a sequence inspired by the initial robbery of Nash's home.
Wonderland (2003), a crime-drama film about the Wonderland murders, was directed by James Cox and stars Val Kilmer (as John Holmes), Kate Bosworth (as Dawn Schiller), Dylan McDermott (as David Lind), Carrie Fisher (as Sally Hansen), Josh Lucas (as Ron Launius), Christina Applegate (as Susan Launius), Lisa Kudrow (as Sharon Holmes), Tim Blake Nelson (as Billy Deverell), Janeane Garofalo (as Joy Miller), and Eric Bogosian (as Eddie Nash)

Television
Numerous television shows have covered the Wonderland murders, such as:
20 Most Horrifying Hollywood Murders (E!, 2006) – a TV movie documentary in which the Wonderland murders ranked #7
E! True Hollywood Story: John Holmes and the Wonderland Murders (E!, 2000) – Season 4, Episode 23
Hidden City: Los Angeles: Black Dahlia, John Holmes & Wonderland (Travel Channel) – Season 1, Episode 5
Murder With Friends: The Wonderland Murders (2016) – Season 1, Episode 4
Mysteries & Scandals: Wonderland Murderland (2018) – Season 1, Episode 7
Hard Copy: Wonderland Murders (1998)

See also
 List of homicides in California

References

Further reading
 Describes some of the events from John Holmes' perspective.
  Includes an account of the Wonderland Murders and the life and death of John Holmes.
 Contains the complete transcript of Holmes' February 1982 preliminary hearing.
 
 
 
 

Crimes in Los Angeles
1981 in Los Angeles
1981 murders in the United States
Mass murder in 1981
Mass murder in California
Murder in Los Angeles
Organized crime in Los Angeles
Organized crime events in the United States
Laurel Canyon, Los Angeles
People murdered by American organized crime
Deaths by beating in the United States
July 1981 events in the United States
Unsolved mass murders in the United States
Mass murder in the United States